Cyrano is a lunar impact crater that lies on the far side of the Moon. It lies due east of the huge walled plain Gagarin, and to the north of the somewhat smaller crater Barbier.

The most notable aspect of this crater are the small impacts along the western and southwest rim, with the pear-shaped Cyrano P forming the later intrusion into the interior. The remainder of the rim has received some wear, and is particularly eroded at the northern end. There are also a few small craters within the interior, with a merged crater pair near the eastern side and a crater along the northeast inner wall. The northern half of the interior floor is slightly more irregular than the southern part.

Satellite craters
By convention these features are identified on lunar maps by placing the letter on the side of the crater midpoint that is closest to Cyrano.

References

 
 
 
 
 
 
 
 
 
 
 
 

Impact craters on the Moon